Clark Airport was an airfield operational in the mid-20th century in Hanover, Massachusetts. During the time it was closed during World War II, the Pilgrim Ordnance Works was located to the west of the airport.

References

Hanover, Massachusetts
Defunct airports in Massachusetts
Airports in Plymouth County, Massachusetts